Stephan G. Stephansson (October 3, 1853 – August 10, 1927) was a Western Icelander, poet, and farmer. His given name was Stefán Guðmundur Guðmundsson.

He was born in Skagafjörður, Iceland but immigrated to Wisconsin, United States in 1873, at age 19. In 1889 he moved to Markerville, Red Deer County, Alberta, Canada. He did not see Iceland again until 1917, when he was 64 years old.

Stephan was self-educated and worked hard all his life. He wrote after work, and, being an insomniac, he often wrote till dawn. He was under the influence of the American writer Ralph Waldo Emerson and they shared the same beliefs in many matters, including equal rights for men and women. Stephan wrote only in Icelandic and had great influence in his home country.

His poems were published in a six volume book called "Andvökur" (Wakeful Nights).

His letters and essays were published in four volumes, and even if nothing of his poetry had survived, those would have been enough to single him out as one of Iceland's foremost men of letters.

Legacy
His homestead near Markerville is an Alberta Provincial Historic Site.  It has been restored and is open to the public from May 15 until August 31.

The Stephan G. Stephansson Award is named in his honor and awarded annually by the Writers Guild of Alberta.

In 1984 folk artist Richard White released an album of Stephansson poems sung in English translation and set to original music called Sun Over Darkness Prevail.

References

 

1853 births
1927 deaths
Icelandic male poets
Icelandic emigrants to Canada
Persons of National Historic Significance (Canada)
Place of death missing
Icelandic emigrants to the United States
19th-century Icelandic people